Mitar Subotić "Suba" (23 June 1961 – 2 November 1999), also known as Rex Ilusivii (Latin for The King of Illusions), was a Serbian-born musician and composer who was set to become one of Brazil's most prominent producers where he died in November 1999.

Subotić obtained a university degree in his hometown from the University of Novi Sad, Vojvodina, Serbia, before continuing electronic music studies in Belgrade. He was a pioneer of electronic music in former Yugoslavia, since he mixed and produced a number of celebrated albums of Yugoslav new wave acts such as Ekatarina Velika, Haustor, Marina Perazić in the course of the 1980s. In 1986, his fusion of electronic music and Yugoslav folk lullabies, In The Mooncage was awarded the International Fund for Promotion of Culture from UNESCO, which included a three-month scholarship to research Afro-Brazilian rhythms in Brazil. Falling in love with the country and its music, he emigrated to São Paulo in the 1990s, where his fruitful production began and ended. During that time he participated Milan Mladenović's last project Angel's Breath, and recorded his famous album São Paulo Confessions.

On 2 November 1999 he was working on the post-production of the album of his new-found diva, Bebel Gilberto, when his studio caught fire. Overcome by smoke, he died trying to rescue the newly recorded material with her. Suba died just a few days after the release of his album São Paulo Confessions, and shortly before the completion of Bebel Gilberto's acclaimed Tanto Tempo, the biggest selling Brazilian album outside Brazil.

Biography

Early years (1961-1982) 
Mitar Subotić "Suba" was born on 23 June 1961 in Novi Sad, where he attended the music elementary school, playing accordion and achieving notable success with his accordion school orchestra in Yugoslavia and abroad. He started his career as a rock musician as a keyboard player in the short lived bands 96% and XX vek (20th Century), the latter disbanding in 1982, after which he turned to his own solo career. He studied composition and orchestration at the University of Novi Sad music academy, during which he had shown an interest for electronic music. This was the reason why he attended the electronic music course organized at the University of Belgrade by Paul Pignon, a British saxophone player temporary living in Belgrade. At the time, under the strong influence by the French ambient music composer Erik Satie and British keyboard player and producer Brian Eno, he started recording ambiental music compositions, experimenting with different sounds, including telephone sounds, bird twitter and Amazon basin indigenous music.

Career in Yugoslavia (1983-1989) 
His first recordings Subotić released in an original way: the tracks signed under the pseudonym Rex Ilusivii he delivered personally to the Radio Novi Sad reception desk addressed to Dragan Gojković "Goja", the host of the Yu pop scena (Yu Pop Scene) and Novi Vidici (New Horizons) cult radio shows, who subsequently broadcast the recordings without knowing the author's true identity. After a year of weekly sending new compositions to Gojković, Subotić decided to discover his identity, after which came a live presentation of his work with performances in Novi Sad, Belgrade, Zagreb, Ljubljana, Sarajevo and Subotica. In 1983, with the Novi Sad conceptual art Lina Bus, Subotić performed in Paris and Venice and with the comic book artist Zoran Janjetov and multimedia artist Kosta Bunuševac, he organized the first Yugoslav rock performance at the sold-out Belgrade SKC. At the time Janjetov was one of his key collaborators, as he recommended him to use the pseudonym Rex Ilusivii by a comic-book character, gave him certain ideas and named several compositions.

The compositions recorded in the period between 1983 and 1985 were a part of the Subotić's project Promene (Changes), the title being self-explanatory of the musical experimenting Subotić had undertaken, in which Subotić collaborated with a number of already well-known musicians, resulting in a number of true radio hits: Zoran Janjetov "Janja", in the track "Jeti" ("Yetti"), Jakarta vocalist Igor Popović, in the songs "Ptice" ("The Birds") and "Arabija" ("Arabia") featuring Tomo in der Mühlen on guitar, Ekatarina Velika frontman Milan Mladenović, in the cover of the James Brown song "Sex Machine", Denis i Denis singer Marina Perazić, in the song "Plava jutra" ("Blue Mornings"), and Dorian Gray frontman Massimo Savić, in the composition "Facedance". The composition "Zla kob" ("Doom"), recorded under the obvious influence of the Serbian orthodox music, Zoran Modli included on the PGP RTB various artists compilation Ventilator 202 vol. 1, released in 1983. Two years later, the song "Arabija" appeared on the Ventilator 202 vol. 3 compilation.

Subotić's debut studio album Disillusioned, having been turned down by the major Yugoslav record companies, was released as a part of the 30th anniversary celebration of the Radio Novi Sad show Randevu sa muzikom (A Rendezvous with Music) in a limited pressing of 500 copies. The recording sessions featured Milan Mladenović, Uroš Šećerov, Massimo Savić, Električni Orgazam bassist Zoran Radomirović "Švaba", and the pianist Branka Parlić. The album B-side featured the twenty-five-minute composition "Thanx Mr. Rorschach - ambijenti na teme Erika Satija" ("Thanx Mr. Rorschach - ambients on Erik Satie themes"), composed as a kind of a musical Rorschach test on the impressions from Satie's themes. The album back cover featured a dedication to Hrundi Bakshi and a review by the head of the Erik Satie foundation saying "It is a great pleasure to see that in Yugoslavia works a musician Mitar Subotić - Rex Ilusivii who composed some significant material, especially a piece, an homage to Satie, composed in a way that Satie would like best - that everyone finds one's own path and one's personality. The music of Rex Ilusivii presents exactly this formula, this procedure."

Simultaneously with the album recording and release, Subotić had worked on music for television, theatre plays and choreodramas: for Haris Pašović's "Jelka kod Ivanovih" ("Fir Tree at Ivan's") and "Mara SAD" ("Mara USA"), Nada Kokotović's "Nojeva barka" ("Noah's Ark"), "U potrazi za izgubljenim vremenom" ("A Quest for Lost Time"), "Plavobradi" ("Bluebeard") and "Medeja" ("Medea"), and Sookie John "Šma" ("Shma"). He had also worked as a producer and sound engineer for other Yugoslav acts: in 1985 he produced the Haustor album Bolero, the Heroina and La Strada eponymous debut albums, Oktobar 1864 1988 album Igra bojama (Color Play) and the Ekatarina Velika 1989 album Samo par godina za nas (Only a Few Years For Us). A number of Novi Sad bands, including Obojeni Program had Subotić as a sound engineer on their recordings, and he had also worked as a sound engineer for the live appearances by Ekatarina Velika and Karlowy Vary. The recording of the Ekatarina Velika 1988 concert at the SMP Novi Sad, with Subotić as the sound engineer was released in 1997 as Live '88.

The interest for electroacoustic music, which he had shown since his early works through the motifs of Serbian folkloric lullabies, took him to Paris where in 1985 he composed theatre music and at the IRCAM institute he expanded his knowledge in the field of electronic-acoustic music. During his stay in Paris, with Goran Vejvoda he started recording the album The Dreambird, in the Mooncage, which was the last to feature the pseudonym Rex Ilusivii, featuring the a combination of bird-twitter recordings, made at Madagascar, combined with the Serbian traditional lullabies and electronic music arrangements. The recordings were promoted in an original way in the period between 1986 and 1992 by broadcasting the recordings on the main squares of Yugoslav, Italian and Brazilian cities. Owing to the UNESCO award for promoting traditional culture, which he had got for The Dreambird, in the Mooncage, he got a scholarship in São Paulo where he landed on 15 March 1990 and decided to permanently inhabit. Part of the recorded material was released as The Dreambird in 1994 by the Brazilian label COMEP Music.

Career in Brazil (1990-1999) 
Soon after becoming the resident of São Paulo Subotić started composing and recording music for radio, television, fashion shows and theatre plays, becoming acclaimed and distinguished producer, mainly due to his combining of traditional Brazilian music with electronic music arrangements. He had also started collaborating with notable Brazilian musicians and bands of the time: Katia B, Cibelle, Taciana, Bebel Gilberto (the daughter of the famous Brazilian singer João Gilberto), Arnaldo Antunes, Marina Lima, Marisa Monte, João Donato, João Parayba, and Mestre Ambrósio. During the second part of the 1990s he was credited on a large number of Brazilian albums as an arranger and a producer: on the 1995 albums Kizumba by João Parayba, Janela dos Sonhos by Taciana, the 1996 96 Sessions by Hermeto Pascoal, Andre Geraisatte and J.P, Benzina by Edgard Scandurra, Silêncio by Arnaldo Antunes, Ale Muniz 1997 album Idem, and the 1998 albums Pierrot do Brazil by Marina Lima, Fuá na Casa de Cabral by Mestre Ambrósio and Clubbing by Edson Cordeiro. He had also worked with the former Grateful Dead drummer Mickey Hart and the American band War.

In the Spring of 1994, with Milan Mladenović he started recording material for their collaboration project Angel's Breath, featuring a lineup of Brazilian musicians percussionist João Parayba, guitarist Fabio Golfetti, vocalists Mariza and Madalena, which combined alternative rock with Serbian and Balkan traditional music. Recorded for three months in leisurely conditions, Angel's Breath featured the prominent tracks "Crv" (Serbian for "The Worm"), "Assassino" (Portuguese for "Murderer") and "Praia do ventu eternu" (similar to "Praia do vento eterno" which is Portuguese for "The Beach of Eternal Wind"). This was Mladenović's last project; on his return to Serbia, on 5 November 1994, he died in Belgrade at the age of 36. The Serbian critic Petar Luković, in a critical review of the album said "Angel's Breath is not a soft, easy going record, it demands attention, participation, it is an album which corresponds with the listener as much as the listener corresponds with itself. Such albums Serbian rock has never had, and with, the departure of Milan Mladenović, I am afraid will never have...".

In November 1999, Subotić released the album São Paulo Confessions in Brazil by Trama Music, in Europe by Ziriguiboom label on Crammed Discs, in Japan by Sony Records and in the United States by Island Records. The album featured guest appearances by the vocalists Cibelle, Katia B and Taciana, jazz guitarist Andre Gerrasiatti, percussionist João Parayba and the members of Mestre Ambrósio. Part of the material from the album was remixed by Phil Asher and the remixes were released as a 12" vinyl EP Você Gosta. São Paulo Confessions received positive critics worldwide.  The album review at Allmusic on which the critic John Vallier gave the album four and a half out of five stars. However, on 2 November 1999, on the evening of the São Paulo Confessions album promotion, in an attempt to rescue the recordings from his studio which had been caught up in a fire, Subotić died at the age of 38.

Legacy 
After Subotić's death, 2000, a non-profit organization The Suba Institute was founded in his honor in Brazil. Since 2008, the Novi Sad Exit festival world music stage was named Suba Stage. In January 2012, it was announced that the Novi Sad Liman park would get a Mitar Subotić place in honor of the musician.

The song Subotić recorded with Marina Perazić, "Plava jutra", was covered by Ana Sofrenović and the recording appeared on the various artists unplugged compilation Bez struje (Unplugged) in 1994. In 2002, a group of musicians from Brazil and the United Kingdom, including Cibelle, Trio Mocotó member João Parahyba, Marina Lima, Phil Asher and Juryman, recorded the Suba tribute album Tributo. In 2005, the Rex Ilusivii In Vitro / Suba Within Us ballet based on Subotić's life was written by choreographer Aleksandra Ketig and the soundtrack for the play was released on the album of the same name. In 2012, the Suba Connection Band, a supergroup consisting of musicians Subotić's had worked with during his career in Brazil, fronted by João Parahyba, performed at the Exit festival's Suba stage.

In 1988, the various artists compilation Ventilator 202 vol. 1, featuring Subotić's song "Zla kob", appeared as number 100 of the list of the 100 greatest Yugoslav popular music albums in the book YU 100: najbolji albumi jugoslovenske rok i pop muzike (YU 100: The Best albums of Yugoslav pop and rock music). In 2006, the song "Plava jutra" ("Blue Mornings") was number 66 on the B92 Top 100 Domestic Songs list, polled by the listeners of the Serbian Radio B92. The list also featured Ekatarina Velika song "Samo par godina za nas" as number one, Haustor songs "Šejn" as number two and "Ena" as number 11, and La Strada song "Okean" as number 39, all from the albums produced by Subotić. In 2008, São Paulo Confessions was included in the musical reference book 1001 Albums You Must Hear Before You Die, edited by Robert Dimery and published in 2005, being , the only Yugoslav act beside Laibach to be included on the list. The list also featured the Bebel Gilberto album Tanto Tempo produced by Subotić before his death. Tanto Tempo became one of the biggest selling Brazilian albums both in and out of Brazil.

The lyrics of the song "Nabor na postelji (Courage)" ("Wrinkle in the Sheets (Courage)"), from the album Disillusioned!, and "Crv", from Angel's Breath, both written by Milan Mladenović, were featured in Petar Janjatović's book Pesme bratstva, detinjstva & potomstva: Antologija ex YU rok poezije 1967 - 2007 (Songs of Brotherhood, Childhood & Offspring: Anthology of Ex YU Rock Poetry 1967 - 2007).

Discography

Studio albums 
 Disillusioned! (1987)
 The Dreambird (with Goran Vejvoda; 1994)
 Angel's Breath (with Milan Mladenović, released as Angel's Breath; 1994)
São Paulo Confessions (1999)
 Rex Ilusivii In Vitro / Suba Within Us (2005)

Tribute albums 
 Tributo (2002)

Other appearances 
 "Zla kob" (Ventilator 202 vol. 1, 1983)
 "Arabia" (Ventilator 202 vol. 3, 1985)
 "In the Mooncage IV", "Outro" (Ex Yu Electronica Vol III, 2012)

References 
 NS rockopedija, novosadska rock scena 1963-2003, Mijatović Bogomir; Publisher: SWITCH, 2005
 EX YU ROCK enciklopedija 1960-2006, Janjatović Petar;

Notes

External links 
 Official blog
 Mitar Subotić at Discogs
 Mitar Subotić at YouTube
 Rex Ilusivii at Discogs
 Rex Ilusivii at Facebook
 Rex Ilusivii at Rateyourmusic
 Rex Ilusivii at Last.fm
 Suba at Facebook
 Suba at Myspace
 Suba at Discogs
 Suba at Rateyourmusic
 Suba at Last.fm

1961 births
1999 deaths
Serbian composers
Serbian rock musicians
Serbian record producers
Musicians from Novi Sad
Brazilian composers
Brazilian rock musicians
Serbian emigrants to Brazil
University of Novi Sad alumni
20th-century composers
Six Degrees Records artists